Hello Heavy is the second full-length studio album recorded by EZ Basic. The album was released in April 2010 by the Hungarian Twelvetones Records.

Background and recording
In the summer of 2009, EZ Basic hired English producer George Shilling who previously produced the recording of bands like Primal Scream, Blur, Bernard Butler (ex-Suede), Soup Dragons, Coldcut, My Bloody Valentine, The Fall, etc.

Track listing
"Sleeping In 	 	
"Motorik Erik 	 	
"May 	
"Layoffs Not Days Off  	
"Fingermonster  	
"Spy FM 	 	
"Pulse 	 	
"Bad Boyfriend  	
"Friends 	 	
"Going South

Personnel
The following people contributed to Hello Heavy:

EZ Basic
Árpád Szarvas - guitars, vocals, bass, keyboards, songwriting
András Tóth - drums

Additional musicians and production
Áron Nagybaczoni - keyboards

References

External links
EZ Basic at Twelvetones Records's webpage

2010 albums
EZ Basic albums